(The) Suicide King may refer to: 
 King (playing card), or king of hearts, sometimes called the "suicide king"
 Suicide King (album), a 2019 album by King 810
 The Suicide King (novel), a novel by Robert Joseph Levy, based on the television series Buffy the Vampire Slayer
 The Suicide King (The Walking Dead), an episode of the television series The Walking Dead

See also
 Suicide Kings, a 1997 American film